Chawand (also spelt Chavand) is a town in Sarada tehsil of Udaipur district, Rajasthan. The historical significance of the town is that it was the last capital of Mewar under the reign of Maharana Pratap.

After the battle of Haldighati, Maharana Pratap captured this area from the Rathors and established his new capital at Chawand in 1585 CE. Maharana Pratap built Chamunda Devi temple here. He built about 16 hideouts within the radius of 10 km to 1 km around his capital to look after the administration. Many secret army stores, palaces, temples and buildings for his loyal Bhils were also constructed here. During a hunting accident, he died on 29 January 1597 in Chawand. A fine statue of Maharana Pratap and his four aide has been built in the memory of Maharana Pratap. A ruined palace once occupied by Maharana Pratap is located in Chawand. and Kuldeep Singh Shaktawat Mewar also belongs to Chawand

References

http://www.udaipur.net/excursions-16-Chavand-Udaipur.html

Cities and towns in Udaipur district
Former capital cities in India